The Trezzo sull'Adda Bridge or Trezzo Bridge was a medieval bridge at Trezzo sull'Adda in Lombardy, Italy, spanning the Adda river. Completed in 1377, the single-arch bridge held the record for the largest span for over four hundred years, until the beginnings of the Industrial Age, while it was not until the early 20th century that masonry bridges with larger openings were constructed.

History
The Trezzo Bridge was built between 1370 and 1377 by order of the lord of Milan Bernabò Visconti. Fortified with towers, it provided access to the Visconti Castle high above the Adda. During a siege in 1416, the condottiero Carmagnola deliberately caused the structure to collapse by weakening one of its abutments. By comparison, the second largest pre-industrial bridge vault, the French Pont de Vieille-Brioude, spans . Today, the two abutments with overhanging remnants of the arch vault are all that remain.

The Trezzo Bridge was not matched until the metal Wearmouth Bridge of the same span was built at Sunderland, England, in 1796. Longer masonry arch spans were not achieved until the 1903 Adolphe Bridge in Luxembourg.

See also 

 Pont de Vieille-Brioude (54 m span)
 Pont Grand (Tournon-sur-Rhône) (49.2 m span)
 Castelvecchio Bridge (48.7 m span)
 Pont du Diable (Céret) (45.45 m span)
 Nyons Bridge (40.53 m span)
 Puente de San Martín (Toledo) (40 m span)
 Ponte della Maddalena (37.8 m span)
 Pont del Diable (37.3 m span)
 Dyavolski most (13 m span)

References

Sources

External links 
 
Lombardia Beni Culturali – Ponte fortificato (ruderi), Trezzo sull'Adda (MI)

Buildings and structures in the Province of Milan
Bridges in Lombardy
Buildings and structures completed in 1377
Deck arch bridges
Stone bridges in Italy
Demolished bridges
Bridges completed in the 14th century